Camp de Thiaroye (also known as The Camp at Thiaroye) is a 1988 Senegalese war-drama film written and directed by Ousmane Sembene and Thierno Faty Sow.

The film entered the competition at the 45th Venice International Film Festival, in which it won the Special Jury Prize. The film depicts the Thiaroye massacre, which happened in Thiaroye, Dakar, in 1944.

The film is about the mutiny by and mass killing of French West African troops by French forces on the night of November 30 to December 1, 1944. West African conscripts were protesting poor conditions and revocation of pay at the Thiaroye camp. The film is a criticism and indictment of the French colonial system.

The film documents the events leading up to the Thiaroye massacre, as well as the massacre itself. The film received positive reviews at the time it was released and continues to be heralded by scholars as an important historical documentation of the Thiaroye massacre.

The film was banned in France for a decade and censored in Senegal as well.

Plot summary

A Senegalese platoon of soldiers from the French Free Army are returned from combat in France and held for a temporary time in a military encampment with barbed wire fences and guard towers in the desert. Among their numbers are Sergeant Diatta, the charismatic leader of the troop who was educated in Paris and has a French wife and child, and Pays, a Senegalese soldier left in a state of shock from the war and concentration camps and who can only speak in guttural screams and grunts.

All is well until the soldiers start to complain about the food offered in the camp, to which the French commander says he will do nothing about, as meat is reserved for white officers. To kill time, Sergeant Diatta goes into town to find a brothel, and is thrown out of one because he is African; he is subsequently found by American troops, who beat and capture him. As revenge, the Senegalese troops capture a white American soldier and an exchange is made between the two prisoners, and the Americans threaten to level the camp and kill everyone.

As the Senegalese troops are about to be transferred out of the camp, they learn they will only be given half the pay for their service as the French troops are unfairly converting French francs to Senegalese francs at half the rate to save money. The Senegalese troops capture the camp and take a French general hostage, beginning a mutiny. The mutiny ends when the officer gives them his word that they will be given their proper pay. That night, they dance and celebrate. At about 3 am, Pays is in a watch tower and sees tanks approaching the camp, and wakes  up the other soldiers, but is unable to tell them what is happening; they think he is saying that Nazis are invading the camp, and dismiss him as being crazy. An hour or so later, the French tanks open fire on the camp, killing Diatta, Pays and the rest of the Senegalese platoon.

Cast 
 Sidiki Bakaba
 Hamed Camara
 Ismaël Lô
 Philippe Chamelat
 Marthe Mercadier
 Casimir Zoba, aka Zao
 Jean-Daniel Simon

See also
 Cinema of Senegal

References

External links
 

1988 films
English-language Senegalese films
1980s war drama films
War films based on actual events
Films directed by Ousmane Sembène
Venice Grand Jury Prize winners
1988 drama films